The 2019 Scottish League Cup final was an association football match that took place on 8 December 2019 at Hampden Park, Glasgow. It was the final match of the 2019–20 Scottish League Cup, the 74th season of the Scottish League Cup (known as the Betfred Cup for sponsorship reasons), a competition for the 42 teams in the Scottish Professional Football League (SPFL). It was contested by Old Firm rivals Celtic and Rangers, in their 15th meeting in League Cup finals.

As both teams participated in European competitions they entered the competition in the second round. Matches from the second round onward were contested on a one-off basis, with 30 minutes extra time used for matches tied after 90 minutes, and then a penalty shoot-out if they are still level. To qualify for the final Celtic beat Dunfermline Athletic, Partick Thistle and Hibernian. Rangers beat East Fife, Livingston and Heart of Midlothian.

Celtic won 1–0, with a goal from centre back Christopher Jullien, side footing to the net from close range after a free-kick from the left in the 60th minute. It was Celtic's 19th Scottish League Cup win, and 10th straight domestic trophy (three Scottish Premiership titles, three Scottish Cups and four Scottish League Cups).

Route to the final

As both clubs participated in European competitions, they both received a bye through the 2019–20 Scottish League Cup group stage.

Rangers

Celtic

Match

Details

References

2019
2
Celtic F.C. matches
Rangers F.C. matches
2010s in Glasgow
Sports competitions in Glasgow
December 2019 sports events in the United Kingdom
League Cup final
Old Firm matches